Tetrakis(trifluoropropyl)tetramethylcyclotetrasiloxane (D4F) is a chemical substance. It is a derivative of octamethylcyclotetrasiloxane (D4), but also belongs to the class of per- and polyfluoroalkyl substances (PFASs).

It occurs in four diastereomeric forms:

D4F is formed as a reaction by-product in the synthesis of polymethyltrifluoropropylsiloxane (PMTFPS). The starting material is dichloromethyl(3,3,3-trifluoropropyl)silane and tris(trifluoropropyl)trimethylcyclotrisiloxane (D3F) is an intermediate.

It has been detected in wastewater, sewage sludge as well as in biosolid-amended soils.

References

Trifluoromethyl compounds
Siloxanes